Bowen River may refer to:

 Bowen River (New Zealand), a river located in New Zealand.
 Bowen River (Queensland), a river located in Queensland, Australia.